is a town located in Nagano Prefecture, Japan. , the town had an estimated population of 13.067 in 4427 households, and a population density of 290 persons per km2.

Geography
Takamori is in the mountainous south of Nagano Prefecture, in a valley formed by the Tenryu River between the Kiso Mountains and the Akaishi Mountains

Surrounding municipalities
Nagano Prefecture
 Iida
 Matsukawa
 Toyooka
Takagi

Climate
The town has a climate characterized by hot and humid summers, and cold winters (Köppen climate classification Cfa).  The average annual temperature in Takamori is 13.2 °C. The average annual rainfall is 1628 mm with September as the wettest month. The temperatures are highest on average in August, at around 25.5 °C, and lowest in January, at around 1.3 °C.

Demographics
Per Japanese census data, the population of Takamori has recently plateaued after several decades of growth.

History
The area of present-day Takamori was part of ancient Shinano Province. The modern town was established on July 1, 1956, by the merger of the villages of Ichida and Yamabuki.

Economy
Takamori is traditionally noted for its production of persimmons. The Yokohama Rubber Company has a plant in Takamori.

Education
Takamori has one public elementary school and one public middle school operated by the town government. The town does not have a high school.

Transportation

Railway
 JR Tokai – Iida Line
  -  -  -

Highway
 Chūō Expressway

Sister cities
  Omaezaki, Shizuoka

In popular culture
In Season 6 of the animated spy comedy Archer, holdout soldier Sato Kentaro encounters the titular character in the jungles of Borneo. Ensuing discussion reveals that Sato, his wife, and young daughter lived in Takamori before the outbreak of World War II.

References

External links
 
Official Website 

 
Towns in Nagano Prefecture